Punctate epithelial erosions are a pathology affecting the cornea.

Signs and symptoms 
It is a characterized by a breakdown or damage of the epithelium of the cornea in a pinpoint pattern, which can be seen with examination with a slit-lamp.   Patients may present with non-specific symptoms such as red eye, tearing, foreign body sensation, photophobia and burning.

Cause 
Punctate epithelial erosions may be seen with different disorders:

Rosacea
Dry-eye syndrome
Blepharitis
Acute bacterial conjunctivitis 
Trauma
Exposure keratopathy from poor eyelid closure
Ultraviolet or chemical burn
Contact lens-related disorder such as toxicity or tight lens syndrome
Trichiasis
Entropion or ectropion
Floppy eyelid syndrome
Chemotherapy i.e. cytosine arabinoside
Thygeson's Superficial Punctate Keratopathy

Diagnosis
Slit lamp examination

Treatment 
Due to the different underlying causes, proper diagnosis, treatment, and prognosis can only be determined by an eye care professional. Punctate epithelial erosions may be treated with artificial tears.  In some disorders, topical antibiotic is added to the treatment.  Patients should discontinue contact lens wear until recovery.

References

Eye diseases